Charlotte Felicitas of Brunswick-Lüneburg (8 March 1671–29 September 1710) was a German noblewoman. She was born into the House of Hanover and later married into the House of Este, which were both part of the House of Welf. She was thus the Duchess of Modena by marriage. She died in childbirth. Some sources refer to her simply as Charlotte.

Biography

Born at Schloss Herrenhausen in Hanover, a palace later destroyed in World War II, she was the eldest surviving daughter of John Frederick, Duke of Brunswick-Lüneburg and his wife, Benedicta Henrietta of the Palatinate. Her father had been the ruler of Brunswick-Lüneburg since 1665 and her parents had been married since 1668.

Charlotte Felicitas had an older sister, Princess Anna Sophie (who died in childhood), as well two younger sisters: Princess Henrietta (who died unmarried) and Princess Wilhelmina Amalia, who made a prestigious marriage in 1699 to the Holy Roman Emperor, Joseph I. After the death of her father in 1679, her mother returned to France, taking her three daughters with her. In France, Charlotte Felicitas and her sisters were given a Catholic education by her great-aunt Louise Holladine at the convent of Maubuisson.

Charlotte Felicitas married Rinaldo d'Este in Modena on 11 February 1696. The youngest child of Francesco I d'Este, Duke of Modena and his third wife Lucrezia Barberini, Rinaldo had been created a cardinal in 1685, but he left the church in 1694 to succeed his nephew Francesco II as Duke of Modena. Rinaldo wanted to encourage relations between Modena and Brunswick, whose ruling house was the House of Hanover. The marriage was celebrated splendidly despite financial problems in Modena; the artist Marcantonio Franceschini was commissioned to paint a room, the Salone d'onore at the ducal palace in honour of the marriage.

Charlotte Felicitas fled Modena for Bologna in 1702 along with the rest of the Modenese royal family in order to avoid French troops in Italy due to the War of the Spanish Succession.

Her husband was sixteen years older than Charlotte Felicitas, but the two had seven children. After her death, her son Francesco, the ducal heir, married in 1721 Charlotte Aglaé d'Orléans, the daughter of Philippe d'Orléans, the Régent of France during the childhood of King Louis XV. Her third daughter, Enrichetta, went on to marry first in 1727 Antonio Farnese, Duke of Parma and, after his death in 1731, Leopold, Landgrave of Hesse-Darmstadt (1708-1764), Imperial Field Marshall, youngest surviving son of Philip of Hesse-Darmstadt and Princess Marie Ernestine of Croÿ (1673–1714).

Charlotte Felicitas died at the Ducal Palace of Modena after giving birth to a daughter in September 1710. The child also died. She was buried at the Church of San Vincenzo in Modena. Her son succeeded as Duke of Modena in 1737.

Issue

Princess Benedetta d'Este (18 Aug 1697 – 16 September 1777) died unmarried;
Francesco d'Este (2 July 1698 – 22 February 1780) future Duke of Modena; married Charlotte Aglaé d'Orléans and had issue;
Amalia Giuseppina d'Este (28 Jul 1699 – 5 July 1778) married the Marquis de Villeneuf, had no issue;
Gian Federico d'Este (1 September 1700 – 24 April 1727)
Princess Enrichetta d'Este (27 May 1702 – 30 January 1777) married Antonio Farnese, Duke of Parma had no issue; married Leopold, Landgrave of Hesse-Darmstadt, grandson of Louis VI, Landgrave of Hesse-Darmstadt, had no issue;
Clemente d'Este (20 April 1708 – 23 April 1708) died in infancy;
X d'Este  (September 1710) female, died at birth;

Ancestry

References and notes

|-

1671 births
1710 deaths
Nobility from Hanover
Deaths in childbirth
House of Este
Duchesses of Modena
Duchesses of Reggio
17th-century German people
18th-century German people
House of Hanover
Duchesses of Brunswick-Lüneburg
Daughters of monarchs